HMS Swindon was a Hunt-class minesweeper of the Aberdare sub-class built for the Royal Navy during World War I. She was not finished in time to participate in the First World War and was sold into civilian service in 1921.

Design and description 
The Aberdare sub-class were enlarged versions of the original Hunt-class ships with a more powerful armament. The ships displaced  at normal load. The ships' complement consisted of 74 officers and ratings.

The ships had two vertical triple-expansion steam engines, each driving one shaft, using steam provided by two Yarrow boilers.

The Aberdare sub-class was armed with a quick-firing (QF)  gun forward of the bridge and a QF twelve-pounder (76.2 mm) anti-aircraft gun aft. Some ships were fitted with six- or three-pounder guns in lieu of the twelve-pounder.

Construction and career 
Swindon was renamed from HMS Bantry in 1918 to avoid any conflict between the vessel name and a coastal location. In 1921 she was sold off and converted to a coastal passenger/freight steamer  by the Coaster Construction Co of Montrose, Scotland for the Union Steamship Co of British Columbia. She was laid up and sold to Coast Ferries in 1951, then scrapped at Gambier Island, BC in 1952.

See also 
 Swindon, Wiltshire

Notes

References 
 
 
 
 

 

Hunt-class minesweepers (1916)
Royal Navy ship names
1918 ships